Oak Grove School District 68 is a primary school district in Peoria County, Illinois.  It receives students from portions of Bartonville and rural Peoria County.  District 68 feeds into Limestone Community High School District 310.

Until 2017, the district had two schools, both in Bartonville: Oak Grove East for kindergarten and lower grades, and Oak Grove West, a junior high school for upper grades.  For the 2017–2018 school year, the schools were combined as Oak Grove School.  , the district had around 263 students and 23 teachers, down from around 410 students and 50 staff in 2010.

References

External links
 

Education in Peoria County, Illinois
School districts in Illinois